Lat (also Romanized as Lāt) is a village in Sardar-e Jangal Rural District, Sardar-e Jangal District, Fuman County, Gilan Province, Iran. At the 2006 census, its population was 106, in 24 families.

References 

Populated places in Fuman County